Group 8 of the UEFA Women's Euro 2017 qualifying competition consisted of five teams: Norway, Austria, Wales, Israel, and Kazakhstan. The composition of the eight groups in the qualifying group stage was decided by the draw held on 20 April 2015.

The group was played in home-and-away round-robin format. The group winners qualified directly for the final tournament, while the runners-up also qualified directly if they were one of the six best runners-up among all eight groups (not counting results against the fifth-placed team); otherwise, the runners-up advance to the play-offs.

Standings

Matches
Times are CEST (UTC+2) for dates between 29 March and 24 October 2015 and between 27 March and 29 October 2016, for other dates times are CET (UTC+1).

Goalscorers
10 goals

 Ada Hegerberg

7 goals

 Isabell Herlovsen
 Helen Ward

5 goals

 Nina Burger

4 goals

 Nicole Billa
 Maren Mjelde

3 goals

 Natasha Harding

2 goals

 Katharina Schiechtl
 Emilie Haavi
 Kayleigh Green

1 goal

 Verena Aschauer
 Laura Feiersinger
 Virginia Kirchberger
 Nadine Prohaska
 Sarah Puntigam
 Sarah Zadrazil
 Lee Falkon
 Rachel Shelina Israel
 Begaim Kirgizbaeva
 Mariya Yalova
 Vilde Bøe Risa
 Caroline Graham Hansen
 Andrine Hegerberg
 Ingvild Isaksen
 Lene Mykjåland
 Stine Reinås
 Charlie Estcourt

1 own goal

 Maya Barqui (playing against Austria)

References

External links
Standings, UEFA.com

Group 8